Mopeli Molapo is a Mosotho Olympic middle-distance runner. He represented his country in the men's 1500 meters at the 1980 Summer Olympics. His time was a 3:55.50.

References

1957 births
Living people
Olympic athletes of Lesotho
Athletes (track and field) at the 1980 Summer Olympics